IC4A Championships (Intercollegiate Association of Amateur Athletes of America) is an annual men's competition held at different colleges every year. Association was established in 1875,  the competition (started in 1876) served as the top level collegiate track and field meeting in the United States, prior to the establishment the National Collegiate Athletic Association's championships in 1921. The IC4A one of the oldest annual track meets in the United States. Currently, the Eastern College Athletic Conference serves as the administrative unit controlling the IC4A brand.

The IC4A or ICAAAA body (Intercollegiate Association of Amateur Athletes of America) body controls the track and field contests between the colleges known as the "IC4A." Colleges and universities eligible to compete at the IC4A Championships are those in the New England and Mid-Atlantic States, north and inclusive of Maryland and Delaware.  Additionally, teams whose schedules include predominantly teams from that region are also eligible, make the de facto limits of the region reach as far south as North Carolina and as far west as West Virginia. The sobriquet "IC4A" only applies to NCAA Division I competition; men's cross country and track competitions hosted by the ECAC for Division II or III are referred to as ECAC meets. The IC4A and its women's counterpart, the ECAC Division I Championships, are so-called "super-conference" meets, in that schools belong to other conferences as their primary championship conference, like the Atlantic 10, Big East, Ivy League or Northeast Conference.

The IC4A cross country championships had their 104th running in the fall of 2012 and is always held at Van Cortlandt Park in Bronx, New York. Following the success of the outdoor meeting, an indoor championships was created in 1921. In both indoor and outdoor track, the top eight finishers in each event or relay earn the honorary designation of "All-East," while in cross country the designation is extended to the top-25 finishers.

Events

1876 the outdoor events included 100 yard, 440 yard, 880 yard, mile, 120 yard hurdles, HJ, LJ, SP, and Walk.     These events have evolved over the years.

Indoor

60m Dash
200m Dash
400m Dash
500m Run
800m Run
1,000m Run
Mile Run
3,000m Run
5,000m Run
55m Hurdles
4 × 400 m Relay
4 × 800 m Relay
Distance Medley Relay
High Jump
Pole Vault
Long Jump
Triple Jump
Shot Put
35-lbs Weight Throw
Heptathlon

Outdoor

100m Dash
200m Dash
400m Dash
800m Run
1,500m Run
3,000m Steeplechase
5,000m Run
10,000m Run
110m Hurdles
400m Hurdles
4 × 100 m Relay
4 × 400 m Relay
4 × 800 m Relay
High Jump
Pole Vault
Long Jump
Triple Jump
Shot Put
Discus
Hammer Throw
Javelin
Decathlon

References

Resources
Eastern College Athletic Conference
Outdoor IC4A Champions from 1876 to 1942 at GBR Athletics

External links

  1924 Official Handbook IC4A
  University of Pacific, An Historical Study of the Pole Vault; IC4A formed 1875

College track and field competitions in the United States
1875 establishments in the United States
Recurring sporting events established in 1876
Annual track and field meetings
Track and field organizations